Oljato-Monument Valley is a double community on the border of the U.S. states of Arizona and Utah.  It includes the following census-designated places:
Oljato-Monument Valley, Arizona
Oljato-Monument Valley, Utah

See also 
Monument Valley (disambiguation)
 Oljato (disambiguation)